Harriet Jane Morahan is an English actress. Her roles include Sister Clara in The Golden Compass (2007), Gale Benson in The Bank Job  (2008), Alice in The Bletchley Circle (2012–2014), Ann in Mr. Holmes (2015), Rose Coyne in My Mother and Other Strangers (2016), and Agathe/The Enchantress in Beauty and the Beast (2017).

Early life
Morahan is the younger daughter of director Christopher Morahan and actress Anna Carteret. Her older sister Rebecca is a theatre director, and her half-brother Andy is a music video and film director. As a child, she attended parties thrown by Sir Laurence Olivier, who once helped her with her mathematics homework.

Morahan was educated at Frensham Heights School. She wanted to attend Newcastle University, but her father encouraged her to follow older sister Rebecca to New Hall, Cambridge, where she graduated with a BA in English in 2000. While at Cambridge, she directed and appeared in student productions, including A View from the Bridge, which won her 'the most outstanding performance' award at the 1999 National Student Drama Festival for her role as Catherine.

Following Cambridge, Morahan's parents encouraged her to attend the Royal Academy of Dramatic Art, but she was eager to begin working and told her parents she would enroll only if she was not working professionally within a year.

Career
Morahan made her professional debut at 17, playing the leading role of Una Gwithian in a two-part BBC television adaptation of The Peacock Spring (1996).

Morahan joined the Royal Shakespeare Company in 2001, making her theatre debut at Stratford-upon-Avon in Love in a Wood and her London debut at the Barbican Theatre (that December) in Hamlet. Other credits for the company included Night of the Soul and Prisoner's Dilemma.

At the Tricycle Theatre in March 2004 she played Ruby, a 1960s hippie who becomes a disenchanted 1980s political wife, for the Oxford Stage Company revival of Peter Flannery's Singer. In the same year she first worked with Katie Mitchell at the National Theatre when she starred in the title role of Euripides' Iphigenia at Aulis.

In July 2005, she appeared again at the National in Nick Dear's Power, staged in the Cottesloe Theatre and also won acclaim at the West Yorkshire Playhouse, Leeds, in September 2005 playing Viola in Ian Brown's production of Twelfth Night.

In 2006, she played the leading role, of Penelope Toop, in Douglas Hodge's touring revival of Philip King's hit farce See How They Run. In the same year, for her Lyttelton Theatre performance as Nina in Katie Mitchell's staging of Chekhov's The Seagull, she was awarded second prize in the Ian Charleson Awards 2007.

TV credits include Bodies and BBC One's Outnumbered, where she portrays recurring character Jane. She has appeared in series 1, 2 and 4 of Outnumbered, as well as the Christmas Specials in 2009, 2011 and 2012.

In January 2008, she appeared in the film The Bank Job, and she played a mounted policewoman in the ITV comedy drama pilot Bike Squad.

Giving a career enhancing performance, she also played Elinor Dashwood in BBC One's three-part adaptation, by Andrew Davies, of  Jane Austen's novel Sense and Sensibility, first broadcast on New Year's Day 2008. On 13 June 2008, she won Best Actress at the 14th Shanghai Television Festival for her performance.

On 26 February 2008, she played Libby, a graduate investigating mis-selling of bank loans, in D.J. Britton's radio play When Greed Becomes Fear, a BBC Radio 4 Afternoon Play 'inspired by the sub-prime lending fiasco in America.'

She worked again with director Katie Mitchell, co-starring with Benedict Cumberbatch in The City, a new, darkly comic mystery play by Martin Crimp, 24 April – 7 June 2008.

In July 2008, she returned to the National to appear in ...some trace of her, Katie Mitchell's adaptation of Dostoyevsky's The Idiot, co-starring Ben Whishaw at the Cottesloe Theatre, while later in the year she played Mary in T.S. Eliot's The Family Reunion at the Donmar Warehouse.  She returned to the National in April 2009 to play Kay Conway in Rupert Goold's production of J. B. Priestley's Time and the Conways in the Lyttelton auditorium  and also Dawn in Caryl Churchill's Three More Sleepless Nights in the same season.

On 28 February 2010, she appeared as Miss Enid in Lark Rise to Candleford, and then as Martina Twain in the BBC adaptation of Martin Amis's Money. In the theatre, she played Annie in The Real Thing by Tom Stoppard at The Old Vic theatre, directed by Anna Mackmin, from April to June 2010; a year later returning to the stage in Thea Sharrock's pared-down Sheffield Crucible revival of David Hare's 1978 Plenty: Morahan affords the heady sensation of watching an actress at the top of her game (Sunday Times, Culture, 14 February 2011).

From 29 June to 26 July 2012, she played the lead role of Nora, opposite Dominic Rowan's Torvald, in a new version of A Doll's House by Simon Stephens at London's Young Vic Theatre, in a production directed by Carrie Cracknell and designed by Ian MacNeil. Her performance saw her named Best Actress at the 2012 Evening Standard Awards and the 2012 Critics' Circle Theatre Awards.

From 8 August to 26 October 2013, Morahan reprised her role as Nora Helmer alongside Dominic Rowan, who returned as her husband Torvald, at the Duke of York's Theatre London.

In July 2015, Morahan played the role of doomed mother Elizabeth Aldridge in the BBC's two-part television adaptation of Sadie Jones' debut novel The Outcast. The Guardians Julia Raeside was impressed with Morahan's portrayal, writing, "She is so perfectly cast, the lack of her is palpable on screen. We miss her too." The following year, Morahan starred in the five-part BBC series My Mother and Other Strangers.

Personal life
Morahan has been in a relationship with actor and director Blake Ritson since they met at Cambridge University in the late 1990s; the pair have been engaged since the mid 2000s. She worked as script supervisor on three of his short films and as costume designer and a performer on Good Boy (2008). "He needs help behind the scenes," she told The Sunday Times. "I'm happy to supply it. I just like to get on with it." Morahan gave birth to the couple's daughter, Amity, in August 2016.

Credits

Film and television

Theatre

Radio

References

External links
 Hattie Morahan at United Agents
 

Alumni of New Hall, Cambridge
Critics' Circle Theatre Award winners
English film actresses
English stage actresses
English television actresses
English voice actresses
Living people
People educated at Frensham Heights School
Royal Shakespeare Company members
English Shakespearean actresses
Actresses from London
People from Lambeth
20th-century English actresses
21st-century English actresses
English radio actresses